Dashti-ye Esmail Khani Rural District is in Ab Pakhsh District of Dashtestan County, Bushehr province, Iran. At the census of 2006, its constituent villages were within Darvahi Rural District of Shabankareh District. There were 1,058 inhabitants in 257 households at the following census of 2011, by which time the rural district was established in the newly formed Ab Pakhsh District. At the most recent census of 2016, the population of the rural district was 1,008 in 297 households. The largest of its nine villages was Dashti-ye Esmail Khani, with 546 people.

References 

Rural Districts of Bushehr Province
Populated places in Dashtestan County